The Uya or Bolshaya Uya  is a river in Perm Krai, Russia, a right tributary of the Aspa, which in turn is a tributary of the Iren. The main tributary is the Malaya Uya River (right).

References 

Rivers of Perm Krai